Vaddukoddai (also spelt Vattukkottai, Vatukotai, Vattukotai) is small but important town in the minority Sri Lankan Tamil dominated Jaffna peninsula of Sri Lanka. It became prominent with the founding of Asia’s first modern university level collegiate known as Batticotta Seminary  by the American Missionaries from New England in 1823.

Demography
Most of the residents of the village are Sri Lankan Tamils, with the majority being Hindus and a few Christians. As of 2007, due to the effects of the Sri Lankan civil war the actual number of residents is unknown.

Educational institutions
The village is home to the prominent Jaffna College that was founded as the Batticotta Seminary. Jaffna College is one of the most famous colleges in Jaffna, and is the only private mixed school. Students come from  areas such as Batticaloa and Kandy, as well as Jaffna. Vaddukoddai  is also home to the Vaddu Central College, another important secondary institute of education. There is one tertiary/higher educational institution, known as Jaffna College Institute of Technology, a polytechnic that is used for various vocational training requirements.

Religious establishments
The Church of South India has 21 administrative division throughout the world. It has only one of them known as a diocese in Sri Lanka. The Jaffna Diocese headquarters is in Vaddukoddai. An Amman temple at Sangarathai, a Murugan temples at Adaikalam Thottam and Panguru are three of the main Hindu temples found here.

History
The name of the village suggests that at some point in its history it had a fortress in its midst, possibly from the Aryacakravarti dynasty. But rule by various colonial powers since 1621 has erased all evidence of a fort. The village became prominent during the British colonial period in Sri Lanka as it was chosen as location for one of the nine protestant missions to be established within the small Jaffna peninsula (hardly 15 by 40 miles). The move by the seminary to study Saiva scriptures led to an important social transformation amongst the local Tamils because it began a process that led to a Saiva revivalism led by Arumuka Navalar. Eventually the seminary was renamed Jaffna college and became a secular institution in 1867. The village also played an important role in the recent Sri Lankan civil war as the place where the Tamil United Liberation Front party came up with the Vaddukoddai Resolution in 1976 that articulated the view that minority Sri Lankan Tamils needed separation from rest of Sri Lanka to resolve their political problems.

References

Towns in Jaffna District
Valikamam West DS Division